The documented ties between Georgia and Poland reach back to the 15th century, when the Georgian (Kartlian) Constantine I sent a diplomatic mission to the Polish King Alexander Jagiellon. Later, Polish King Jan III Sobieski tried to establish contacts with Georgia. Many Georgians participated in military campaigns led by Poland in the 17th century.
Bogdan Gurdziecki, a Georgian, who was the greatest authority on all things Persian working in the Polish king's diplomatic service, made frequent diplomatic trips to Persia, on which he obtained, among other things, guarantees upholding earlier privileges for missionaries. Already during the rule of King Jan Kazimierz, he sent on missions to Isfahan, and King Jan III Sobieski availed himself of Gurdziecki's talents in like manner (in 1668, 1671, 1676–1678, in 1682–1684, and in 1687). Gurdziecki remained at the court of the shah for several years in the capacity of special resident and representative of the Polish king; it was he who delivered to the shah Suleiman news about the victory of the Christian forces at Vienna (1683).

Several Georgian politicians, intellectuals and military officers left Georgia for Poland after the Soviet armies invaded the Democratic Republic of Georgia (DRG) in February 1921, taking over the government and establishing the Georgian Soviet Socialist Republic in the same March. Although not very numerous and consisting of a few hundred members, the Georgian community of Poland was very active politically and culturally. The best remembered are, however, the Georgian military personnel who served in the Polish ranks from the early 1920s until the end of World War II.

Georgian Prometheism 

Active diplomatic contacts developed between the short-lived DRG and Poland was part of Józef Piłsudski's well-known political concept known as Prometheism. Its aim was to greatly reduce the power of the Russian Empire and subsequently, the Soviet Union, by supporting nationalist independence movements of the major non-Russian peoples that lived within the borders of Russia or the Soviet Union. 

The Georgian Promethean groups were one of the most active within the movement. This was not overlooked by the Bolsheviks, who in 1930 organized the assassination of Noe Ramishvili, a prominent Georgian political leader and a major promoter of Prometheism.

The 1932 Polish-Soviet mutual nonaggression pact precipitated the downfall of the Promethean movement though the Georgians continued their activities in various cultural and social organizations. The most important was the Committee of Georgia founded as early as 1921 by several Georgian intellectuals led by Sergo Qurulashvili. They had close contacts with the centers of Georgian political emigration across Europe, primarily in Paris. The Committee organized various meetings and social activities and provided material support for the Georgian émigrés. It also published its own publications, ProGeorgia (1922), and Propartia (1923). From 1923 to 1924, Qurulashvili also directed the journal Schlos Wschodu pertaining to the Georgian problems. The Georgians organized also the Union of Georgian Students and the Polish-Georgian Society led by Prince Pavle Tumanishvili. The activities of these organizations were limited, however, due to financial difficulties.

Georgians in the Polish military service 

Immediately after the fall of the DRG, Noe Zhordania, the head of the Georgian government-in-exile, addressed the friendly nations, particularly France, Greece and Poland, to help in maintaining the professional military cadres. The government of Poland promptly responded, and from 1922 to 1924, hundreds of Georgian Junkers and officers, recommended by Zhordania’s government, were accepted in the Polish military schools. Several professional officers of the former DRG attended military training courses at the Polish army centers. Although not obligated to do so, virtually all of them were subsequently enrolled in the Polish army as contract officers. In the subsequent decade, the total number of Georgian military servicemen reached 1,000.  
      
At the outbreak of World War II, most of the Georgian officers took part in the 1939 Defensive War, and several of them commanded their own regiments composed of Polish soldiers.  The most notable officers were:

Zakaria Bakradze, generał dywizji, deputy commander of Polish 15th Infantry Division.
Aleksandre Chkheidze, generał brygady, deputy commander of Polish 16th Infantry Division.
Ivane Kazbegi, generał brygady.
Aleksandre Koniashvili, generał brygady.
Kirile Kutateladze, generał brygady.
Aleksandre Zakariadze, generał brygady.
Jerzy Tumaniszwili, captain of the navy, who was awarded Virtuti Militari.
Valerian Tevzadze, podpułkownik, the commander of the northern sector of the Polish defences during the siege of Warsaw.
Mikheil Kvaliashvili, major, the commander of a cavalry battalion within the 15th Uhlans Regiment.

Several Georgian officers were captured by the Soviet forces during the 1939 campaign. General Chkheidze, Major Mamaladze, Captain Skhirtladze and Captain Rusiashvili were killed during the infamous Katyn Massacre, from 1940 to 1941. Many others spent several years in the gulag camps. 

During the occupation of Poland, the Germans reorganized the Warsaw-based Committee of Georgia and placed it under their tight control. The occupation administration encouraged the Georgian soldiers in the Polish service to join the Georgian Legion of the Wehrmacht. Some of them responded to the Nazi request, but subsequently joined the Polish resistance movement. 

The Georgian Orthodox priest and Professor Grigol Peradze of Warsaw University was killed on December 6, 1942 in the Nazi concentration camp of Auschwitz (Oświęcim) when he took the blame for the murder of a German officer to spare his fellow prisoners, or, according to another report, when he entered a gas-chamber in the place of a Jewish prisoner who had a large family.

The American John Malchase David Shalikashvili, general of the United States Army who served as Chairman of the Joint Chiefs of Staff from 1993 to 1997, was born in Warsaw, Poland, where his father also served in the army.

After the war, most Georgians either left for Western Europe or were deported to the Soviet camps though some of them (e.g., General V. Tevzadze) remained in the Polish anti-Communist underground for several decades.

See also
 Georgia–Poland relations

References

External links 
 Wozniak A., Georgian Émigré Societies and Organizations in Poland 
 Karabin Robert, Prometheism. Caucasian Peoples in the Polish Struggle for Independence 1918-1921
 Karabin Robert, A History of Georgians in the Polish Military
 The Soldiers of Georgia in Polish Service (1923 - 1939) by Dmitri Shalikashvili (translated by Maria Shalikashvili)
Documentary polish film about Georgian contract officers in Polish army

Georgian diaspora
Ethnic groups in Poland
Second Polish Republic
20th century in Georgia (country)
Georgian Soviet Socialist Republic